This is a list of archipelagos, organised by oceans then seas and finally arranged alphabetically.

Arctic Ocean
Archipelagos of the Arctic Ocean:
Achton Friis Islands
Anzhu Islands
Arkticheskiy Institut Islands
Barren Islands
Berkeley Islands
Bonsall Islands
Canadian Arctic Archipelago
Akvitlak Islands
Arvalik Islands
Astronomical Society Islands
Bate Islands
Belcher Islands
Berens Islands
Beverly Islands
Bird Islands
Bjorne Islands
Cape Chidley Islands
Cape Hope Islands
Carter Islands
Champan Islands
Cheere Islands
Clarence Islands
Copeland Islands
Crown Prince Islands
Digges Islands
Duke of York Archipelago
Finlaysin Islands
Harrison Islands
Hay Islands
Hecla and Fury Islands
Fury Islands
Hecla Islands
Hovgaard Islands
Keith Islands
Leo Islands
Low Islands
Martin Islands
Minto Islands
Nastapoka Islands
Nauyan Islands
Outcast Islands
Outpost Islands
Paint Hills Islands
Parry Islands
Berkeley Islands
Hosken Islands
Cornwallis Islands
Queen Elizabeth Islands
Cheyne Islands
Fay Islands
Findlay Group
Gretha Islands
Marvin Islands
Sverdrup Islands
Tasmania Islands
Tennent Islands
Twin Islands
Saneruarsuk Islands
Solomons Temple Islands
Spicer Islands
Walrus Islands (Nunavut)
Walrus Islands (Southampton)
Cape Farewell Archipelago
Carey Islands
Danske Islands
Diomede Islands
Dunay Islands
Izvestiy TSIK Islands
Faddey Islands
Firnley Islands
Franske Islands
Franz Josef Land
Havard Islands
Heiburg Islands
Kaibigan Islands
Kamennyye Islands
Kasegaluk Lagoon Islands
Kirov Islands
Komsomolskaya Pravda Islands
Labyrintovye Islands
Lofoten
Lyakhovsky Islands
Medvezhyi Islands
Midway Islands
Miles Islands
Mona Islands
New Siberian Islands
De Long Islands
Sedov Archipelago
Nordenskiöld Archipelago
Novaya Zemlya
Nuvuk Islands
Plavnikovyye Islands
Plover Islands
Pye Islands
Return Islands
Routan Islands
Saint Peter Islands
Scott Hansen Islands
Seahorse Islands
Serykh Gusey Islands
Severnaya Zemlya
Shelonsky Islands
Sisters Islands
Solovetsky Islands
Spy Islands
Strutton Islands
Svalbard
Castrénøyane
Repøyane
Ryke Yseøyane
Sabine Islands
Thousand Islands
Tillo Islands
Upernavik Archipelago
Vegaøyan
Vestmannaeyjar
Zveroboy Islands

Atlantic Ocean
Archipelagos of the Atlantic Ocean:

Along the coast of Europe

Berlengas
Estelas Islets
Farilhões-Forcados Islets
British Isles
Aran Islands
Blasket Islands
Carreg Yr Esgob
Copeland Islands
Farne Islands
Inishkea Islands
Hebrides
Outer Hebrides
Flannan Isles
Haskeir Eagach
Monach Islands
St Kilda
Inner Hebrides
Ascrib Islands
Crowlin Islands
Islands of Fleet
Murray Isles
Islands of the Clyde
Isles of Scilly
Magharree Islands
Meini Duon
Isles of Scilly
Orkney
Shetland Islands
North Isles
Scalloway Islands
Out Skerries
Skellig Islands
Slate Islands
Small Isles
Summer Isles
Treshnish Isles
Channel Islands
Chausey
Columbretes Islands
Cíes Islands
Danish Isles
Faroe Islands
Norðuroyggjar
Formigues Islands
Glénan Islands
Isles of Sicily
Lofoten
Medes Islands
Vestmannaeyjar
Þórðarhöfði (Thordarhofdi)

Along the coast of Africa
Arquipélago dos Bijagós
Baboon Islands
Bight of Bonny Islands
Annobón
Bioko
São Tomé e Príncipe
Bissagos Islands
Canary islands
Islas de Elobey
Islas Kai Hai
Cape Verde Islands
Saint Helena
Tristan da Cunha
Turtle Islands, Sierra Leone
Îles de Los

Along the coast of the Americas
Abrolhos Archipelago
Belcher Islands
Bermuda Islands
Bocas del Toro
Broken Islands
Corn Islands
Cranberry Isles
Diego Ramírez Islands
Falkland Islands
Arch Islands
Jason Islands
Fernando de Noronha
Flat Islands, Bovista Bay, Newfoundland and Labrador Flat Islands*
Florida Keys
Hermite Islands
Ildefonso Islands
Karl Oom Islands
Magdalen Islands (Les Îles-de-la-Madeleine)
Marcopeet Islands
Mingan Archipelago
Outer Lands (New England-New York islands)
Payne Islands
Plover Islands
Puerto Rico
Mona Islands
Punuk Islands
Ragged Islands
Saint Peter and Paul Rocks
Salvation's Islands
San Blas Islands
Thimble Islands
Tierra del Fuego
Trindade and Martin Vaz
Wollaston Islands

Macaronesia
Archipelagos of Macaronesia:

Azores
Formigas
Canary Islands
Chinijo Archipelago
Cape Verde
Barlavento Islands
Sotavento Islands
Madeira Islands
Desertas Islands
Savage Islands

Baltic Sea, Gulf of Bothnia and Gulf Of Finland 
Archipelagos of the Baltic Sea, Gulf of Bothnia and Gulf of Finland:

Åland
Archipelago Sea
Beryozovye Islands
Blekinge Archipelago
Bothnian Bay archipelago
Haparanda archipelago
Kalix archipelago
Luleå archipelago
Piteå archipelago
Skellefteå archipelago
Froan
Kvarken Archipelago
Norrbotten Archipelago
Oskarshamn archipelago
Pakri Islands
South Funen Archipelago
Swedish East Coast Archipelago
Gräsö archipelago
Oskarshamn archipelago
Stockholm Archipelago
Rödlöga archipelago
Skarv Archipelago
Södermanland archipelago
Öregrund archipelago
Östergötland archipelago
Gryt archipelago
Sankt Anna's Archipelago
Tjust Archipelago
Småland archipelago
Turku archipelago
West Estonian archipelago

Caribbean Sea and the Gulf of Mexico
Archipelagos of the Caribbean Sea and the Gulf of Mexico:

Archipelago of San Bernando
Cayman Islands
Florida Keys
Rosario Islands
Swan Islands
West Indies
Antilles
Greater Antilles
Cuban Islands
Colorados Archipelago
Cannarreos Archipelago
Jardines de la Reina
Sabana-Camagüey Archipelago
Puerto Rican Islands
Lesser Antilles
Leeward Islands
Petite Terre islands
Virgin Islands
British Virgin Islands
Dog Islands
Little Sisters
Seal Dog Islands
US Virgin Islands
Îles des Saintes
Leeward Antilles
ABC Islands
Las Aves Archipelago
Los Hermanos Archipelago
Los Monjes Archipelago
Los Roques Archipelago
Los Testigos Islands
Lucayan Archipelago
Abacos Islands
Bimini Islands
Berry Islands
Cat Cays
Deadman Cays
Double Headed Shot Cays 
Elbow Cays
Factory Cays
Inagua Islands
Plana Cays
Schooner Cays
Water Cays
Victory Cays
Turks and Caicos
Six Hill Cays
Windward Islands
Brooks Rocks
Cow And Calves Islands
Grenadines

Caspian Sea
Archipelagos of the Caspian Sea:

 Baku Archipelago
 Podvodnyye Islands
Tuledi Araldary
 Tyuleniy Archipelago

Mediterranean Sea
Archipelagos of the Mediterranean Sea:
Aegean Islands
Ayvalık Islands
Cyclades
Dodecanese
Fournoi Korseon
Oinousses
Saronic Islands
Sporades
Tavşan Islands
Aegadian Islands
Aeolian Islands
Alhucemas Islands
Ayvalık
Balearic Islands
Brijuni
Campanian Archipelago
Phlegrean Islands
Cres-Lošinj Archipelago
Elaphiti Islands
Galite Islands
Ionian Islands
Isole Tremiti
Kerkennah Islands
Kornati
Ksamil Islands
Maddalena Archipelago
Maltese Islands
Mola Islands
Paklinski Islands
Pelagie Islands
Phlegraean Islands
Pityusic Islands
Pontine Islands
Rovinj Archipelago
St Paul's Islands
Tuscan Archipelago
Venetian Lagoon
Zadar Archipelago

North Sea
Archipelagos of the North Sea:

Frisian Islands (or Wadden Islands)
Danish Wadden Sea Islands
East Frisian Islands
North Frisian Islands
North Frisian Barrier Islands
West Frisian Islands
Southern Gothenburg Archipelago
Vega Islands (Vegaøyan)

Indian Ocean

Along the coast of Africa 

Bajuni Islands 
Cargados Carajos Shoals (Saint Brandon)
Choazil Islands (Malandzamia Islands)
Comoro Islands
Glorioso Islands
Khuriya Muriya Islands
Mascarene Islands
Mayotte
Quirimbas Islands
Seychelles
African Banks
Aldabra Group
La Digue
Inner Islands
Outer Islands
Alphonse Group
Amirante Islands
Farquhar Group
Socotra Archipelago
Zanzibar Archipelago

Along the coast of Asia 

 Ad Dimaniyat Islands

Andaman Islands and Nicobar Islands
Andaman Islands
Ritchie's Archipelago
Twin Islands
Nicobar Islands
Ashmore and Cartier Islands
Cocos (Keeling) Islands
Hawar Islands
Langkawi
Lakshadweep (Laccadives)
Logo Islands (artificial)
Logo Islands (other artificial one)
Maldives
Mentawai Islands
Nurana Islands
Mergui Archipelago
Palm Jumeirah (artificial)
The World (artificial)

Along the coast of Australia 

Bonaparte Archipelago
Buccaneer Archipelago
Houtman Abrolhos
Wallabi Group
Easter Group
Pelsaert Group
Lacepede Islands
Lamu Archipelago
Mary Anne Group
Recherche Archipelago

Outlying archipelagos 

Chagos Archipelago
Eagle Islands
Crozet Islands
Kerguelen Islands
Prince Edward Islands

Red Sea
Archipelagos in the Red Sea:

Dahlak Archipelago
Farasan Islands
Hanish Islands
Hurghada Archipelago
Sa'ad ad-Din Islands
Seven Brothers Islands
Suakin Archipelago
Zubair Group

Pacific Ocean
New Zealand

Along the coast of the Americas
Aleutian Islands
Andreanof Islands
Bolshoi Islands
Delarof Islands
Fox Islands
Islands of Four Mountains
Komandorski Islands
Kudomin Islands
Near Islands
Rat Islands
Semidi Islands
Shumagin Islands
Alexander Archipelago
Archipelagoes of Patagonia
Guaitecas Archipelago (Archipiélago de las Guaitecas)
Guayaneco Archipelago (Archipiélago Guayaneco)
Chonos Archipelago (Archipiélago de los Chonos)
Diego Ramírez Islands (Islas Diego Ramírez)
Katalalixar Archipielago
Madre de Dios Archipelago
Pearl Islands
Queen Adelaide Archipelago (Archipelago de La Reina Adelaida)
Tierra del Fuego (Archipiélago de Tierra del Fuego)
Wollaston Islands (Islas Wollaston)
Wellington Archipelago
Baranof Archipelago
Bird Rocks
Broughton Archipelago
Channel Islands of California
Chiloé Archipelago (Archipiélago de Chiloé)
Chinchas Islands
Chriswell Islands
Coronado Islands
Desventuradas Islands
Easter Island
Farallon Islands
Flat Islands
Galápagos Islands (Archipiélago de Colón)
Goose Group
Gulf Islands
Haida Gwaii
Islas Secas
Juan Fernández Islands
Minx Islands
Pleiades Islands
Pribilof Islands
Renell Islands
Revillagigedo Islands
San Juan Islands

Along the coast of Asia

Amakusa Islands
Banzhou Archipelago
Chàm Islands
Côn Đảo
Changsan Archipelago
Chastye Islands
Coco Islands
Chumphon Islands
Eugénie Archipelago
Fishers' Islands
Japanese archipelago (including Sakhalin)
Bonin Islands
Habomi Islands
Nanpō Islands
Ryukyu Archipelago
Okinawa Islands
Aguni Islands
Iheya-Izena Islands
Kerama Islands
Yokatsu Islands
Sakishima Islands
Miyako Islands
Yaeyama Islands
Satsunan Islands
Amami Islands
Tokara Islands
Ōsumi Islands
Daitō Islands
Kinmen Islands
Koh Rong Archipelago
Korean Archipelago
Kuril Islands
Liancourt Rocks
Miaodao Archipelago
Malay Archipelago
Great Indonesia Archipelago 
Asia Islands
Ayu Islands
Bacan Islands
Balabalagan Islands
Banda Arc
Banda Islands
Banggai Islands
Bowokan Islands
Bangka Belitung Islands
Banyak Islands
Barat Daya Islands
Babar Islands
Boo Islands
Derawan Islands
Erà Islands
Gili Islands
Gorong Archipelago
Hinako Islands
Kangean Islands
Karakaralong Islands
Karimata Islands
Karimun Islands
Kepulauan Mentawai
Krakatoa Archipelago
Kuran Islands
Laut Kecil Islands
Lease Islands
Leti Islands
Lingga Islands
Lucipara Islands
Maluku Islands
Aru Islands
Kai Islands
Penyu Islands
Watubela Archipelago
Masalembu Islands
Mentawai Islands Regency
Nias Islands
Batu Islands
Obi Islands
Spermonde Archipelago (Pabbring Islands)
Raja Ampat Islands
Fam Islands
Riau Archipelago
Anambas Islands
Natuna Islands
Bunguran Islands
South Natuna
Riau Islands (separate from the Riau Archipelago)
Sabalana Islands
Sangihe Islands
Schouten Islands (Known as Biak Islands and Geelvink Islands)
Selayar Islands
Macan Islands
Taka Bonerate Islands
Sula Islands Also Known As Xulla Islands
Sunda Islands
Greater Sunda Islands
Lesser Sunda Islands
Alor Archipelago
Solor Archipelago
Tanimbar Islands
Talaud Islands
Tayandu Islands
Tengah Islands
Thousand Islands (Indonesia)
Togian Islands
Tudjuh Archipelago
Anambas Islands
Badas Islands
Natuna Islands
Bunguran Islands
South Natuna
Tambelan Archipelago
Tukangbesi Islands
Wakatobi Regency
Widi Islands
Matanani Islands
Perhentian Islands
Philippine Islands (Island nation)
Baco Islands
Batanes
Babuyan Islands
Balintang Islands
Calamian Islands
Semirana Islands
Cuyo Archipelago
Mangsee Islands
Spratly Islands
Sulu Archipelago
Sangboy Islands
Tangawayan Islands
Tinalisayan Islets
Visayas
Camotes Islands
Coaman Islets
Cuatro Islands
Dinagat Islands
Cabilan Islands
Gigantes Islands
Olango Island Group
Ogasawara Islands
Penghu Islands
Poulo Wai islands
Rimsky-Korsakov Archipelago
Shantar Islands
Shengsi Islands
South China Sea Islands
Paracel Islands
Amphitrite Group
Crescent Group
Duncan Islands

Spratly Islands
Zhongsha Islands
Taehwa-Do
Volcano Islands
Yam Islands

Oceania

Australia

Archipelago of the Recherche
Beagle Islands
Bird Isles
Bonaparte Archipelago
Breaksea Islands
Buccaneer Archipelago
Bustard Islands
Celery Top Islands
Corkwood Islands
Crocodile Islands
Dampier Archipelago
Easter Group
Fairfax Islands
Fig Islands
Fisherman Islands
Furneaux Group
Glennie Group
Governor Islands
Hakea Islands
High Cliffy Islands
Home Islands
Hunter Islands
Islands on the Great Barrier Reef
Sir James Smith Group
Anchor Islands
Barrow Islands
Bird Isles
Brook Islands
Bunker Group
Capricon Group
Duke Islands
Fairfax Islands
Family Islands
Frankland Islands
Home Islands
Hoskyn Islands
Ingot Islets
Jeffreys Rocks
Kippel Islands
Moonboom Islands
Red Cliff Islands
Repulse Islands
Torres Strait Islands
Duncan Islands
Turtle Group
Two Brothers
Two Islands
Whitsunday Islands
Investigator Group
Pearson Isles
Kent Group
Kingsmill Islands
Leschenaultia Islands
Louis Islands
Maatsuyker Islands
Mangrove Islands
Mart Islands
Middle Pasco Islands
Minnieritchie Islands
Montebello Islands
Moonboon Islands
Mud Islands
Mulga Islands
North East Isles
Nuyts Archipelago
Pearson Islands
Pelsaert Group
Peron Islands
Quandong Islands
Saint Alouarm Islands
Sir Graham Moore Islands
Sir Joseph Banks Group
Smith Islands
The English Company Islands
Tiwi Islands
Tory Islands
Twin Peak Islands
Vernon Islands
Wallabi Group
Wellesley Islands
South Wellesley Islands
Whitsunday Islands

Melanesia
Bismarck Archipelago
Admiralty Islands
Arawe Islands
Duke of York Islands
Feni Islands
Hermit Archipelago
Kaniet Islands
Lihir Group
Ninigo Islands
Schouten Islands
St Matthias Islands
Tabar Group
Tami Islands
Tanga Islands
Vitu Islands
D'Entrecasteaux Islands
Fiji Islands
Lau Islands (Also known as Lau Group, Eastern Group and Eastern Archipelago)
Marmanuca Islands
Moala Islands
Rotuma Group
Viti Levu Group
Yasawa Islands
Louisiade Archipelago
Bentley Islands
Dumolin Islands
New Caledonia (Kanaky)
Loyalty Islands
New Guinea
Shepherd Islands
Solomon Islands
Solomon Islands (country)
Duff Islands
Santa Cruz Islands
Nggela Islands
New Georgia Islands
Reef Islands
Russell Islands
Shortland Islands
Treasurly Islands
Northern Solomons (Bougainville)
Tonga
Geography of Tonga
Trobiand Islands
Vanuatu (New Hebrides)
Banks Islands
Maskelyne Islands
Mathew and Hunter Islands (Disputed between Vanuatu and France so it could be in here or not)
Shephard Islands
Torres Islands

Micronesia (Subdivision of Oceania not country)
Caroline Islands
Faichuk Islands
Nomiwisofo Group
Gilbert Islands (Kiribati)
Hall Islands
Line Islands
Makur Islands
Mariana Islands
Marshall Islands
Ralik Chain
Ratak Chain
Mortlock Islands (Nomoi Islands)
Upper Mortlock Islands
Palau
Rock Islands
Southwest Islands
Phoenix Islands
Senyavin Islands

Polynesia
Adams Rocks
Aldermen Islands
Antipodes Islands
Auckland Islands
Bounty Islands
Main Group
Centre Group
East Group
Campbell Islands
Chatham Islands
Forty-Fours
The Sisters
Cook Islands (Hervey Islands)
Northern Cook Islands
Southern Cook Islands
Folly Islands
French Polynesia
Acteon Group
Austral Islands
Gambier Islands
Marquesas
Rurutu
Society Islands
Îles du vent (Windward Islands)
Îles sous le vent (Leeward Islands)
Tuamotus
Disappointment Islands
Duke of Gloucester Islands
King George islands
Palliser Islands
Raeffsky Islands
Two Group Islands
Tubuai Group
Hawaiian Islands (Sandwich Islands)
Northwestern Hawaiian Islands
French Frigate Shoals
Gardner Pinnacles
Mercury Islands
New Zealand (main chain)
Bream Islands
Cavalli Islands
Chetwode Islands
Islands of the Hauraki Gulf
Hen and Chicken Islands (NZ)
Marotere Islands
Mayne Islands
Mercury Islands
Mokihinau Islands
Motukawao Islands
The Noises
Kermadec Islands
Poor Knights Islands
Simmonds Islands
Rurima Rocks
Moutoki Islands
Tokata Islands
Open Bay Islands
Rangitoto Islands
Solander Islands
Sugar Loaf Islands
Tata Islands
Three Kings Islands
Titi/Muttonbird Islands
Pitcairn Islands
Samoan Islands (Navigators' Islands)
Aleipata Islands 
American Samoa (Eastern Samoa)
Manu'a
Samoa (Western Samoa)
Snares Islands
Tonga Islands (Friendly Islands)
Tokelau (Union Islands)
Tuvalu (Ellice Islands)
Wallis and Futuna Islands
Horne Islands

Southern Ocean
Aagaard Islands
Afuera Islands or Penguin Island or Dodge Rocks
Allison Islands
Al'bov Rocks
Auster Islands
Austin Rocks
Azimuth Islands
Balleny Islands
Biscoe Islands
Adolph Islands
Barcroft Islands
Bishop and Clerk Islets 
Bugge Islands
Burkett Islands
Colbeck Archipelago
Dellbridge Islands
Dumolin Islands
Faure Islands
Flat Islands
Heard Island and McDonald Islands
Hydrographer Islands
Joinville Island Group
Danger Islands
Judge and Clerk Islets
Law Islands
Marshall Archipelago
Mikkelsen Islands
Nøkkelholmane Islands
Palmer Archipelago
Melchior Islands
Ross Archipelago
Smith Islands
South Georgia
Clerke Rocks
Behnam Nazemi
Kapriyanov Islands
South Sandwich Islands
Candlemas Islands
Central Islands
Southern Thule
Traversay Islands
Vincent Islands
Willis Islands
South Orkney Islands
Flensing Islands
Gosling Islands
Governor Islands
Inaccessible Islands
Larsen Islands
Monk Islands
Murray Islands
Oliphant Islands
Robertson Islands
Whale Skerries
South Shetland Islands
Aim Rocks
Aitcho Islands
Okol Rocks
Alepu Rocks
Atherton Islands
Avren Rocks
Dubar Islands
Meade Islands
Onogur Islands
Potmess Rocks
Asses Ears
Syrezol Rocks
Vardim Rocks
Voluyak Rocks
Zed Islands
Wilhelm Archipelago
Anagram Islands
Argentine Islands
Betbeder Islands
Cruls Islands
Dannebrog Islands
Myriad Islands
Roca Islands
Vedel Islands
Wauwermans Islands
Vetrilo Rocks
Yato Rocks
Yalour Islands
Windmill Islands
Swain Islands

Lakes and rivers
Angai Archipelago
Archipelago of Saint-Pierre Lake
Apostle Islands
Beaver Archipelago
Channel Islands
Dome Islands
Lake Erie Islands
Hen and Chicken Islands (USA)
Hochelaga Archipelago
Mabanda Islets
Sandy Islands (Lake Winnipeg)
Sandy Islands (Lake Wollasten)
Si Phan Don
Slate Islands
Solentiname Islands
Solovetsky Islands
Spider Islands
Ssese Islands
Thousand Islands
The McKivens Archipelago
Thirty Thousand Islands
Ushkan Islands
Vesi Archipelago

By population
 Malay Archipelago 380,000,000 inhabitants
Indonesia 267,000,000
Philippines 108,576,000
 Japanese archipelago
Japan 125,950,000
Sakhalin 498,000
Kuril Islands 19,434
 British Isles 71,900,000
Great Britain 60,800,000 Ireland 6,572,728
 Antilles 43,563,500
Greater Antilles 38,400,500
Lesser Antilles 3,950,000
Lucayan Archipelago 443,000
Leeward Antilles 770,000
 Danish Archipelago 3,000,000
 Maluku Islands 2,844,131
 Riau Islands 2,241,570
 Mascarene Islands 2,195,087
 Canary Islands 2,153,400
 Sulu Archipelago 1,996,970
 Ryukyu Islands 1,550,161
 Hawaiian Islands
Hawaii 1,415,870
 Zanzibar Archipelago 1,350,379
 Comoro Islands 1,153,195
 Balearic Islands 1,107,200
 Gulf of Guinea islands 550,695
Bioko 334,463 São Tomé and Príncipe 211,000 Annobón 5,232
 Cape Verde 550,483
 Malta 493,559
 Maldives 374,775
 Andaman Islands 343,125
 Madeira 289,000
 Society Islands 275,918
 Samoan Islands 257,574
 Azores 246,772
 Mariana Islands 228,600
 Ionian Islands 207,855
 Channel Islands 169,592
 Virgin Islands 145,727
 Caroline Islands 122,368
 Croatian Archipelago 121,366
 Cyclades 119,549
 Gilbert Islands 83,382
 Frisian Islands 81,341
 Lakshadweep 70,365
 Bermuda 64,055
 Faroe Islands 52,337
 Hebrides 46,632
 Nicobar Islands 36,842
 Tuscan Archipelago 34,389
 Bissagos Islands 30,000
 Åland 29,884
 Caicos Islands 26,519
 Galapagos Islands 25,124
 Lofoten 24,500
 Shetland 23,210
 Orkney 22,100
 Grenadines 20,880
 San Juan Islands 17,582
 Southern Cook Islands 16,418
 Kerkennah Islands 15,501
 Aeolian Islands 15,419
 Tuamotus 15,346
 Arctic Archipelago 14,000
 Bocas del Toro Archipelago 13,000
 Magdalen Islands 12,781
 Islands of the Clyde 12,534
 Marquesas Islands 9,346
 Line Islands 8,813
 Aleutian Islands 8,162
 Austral Islands 6,965
 Pelagie Islands 6,556
 Haida Gwaii 4,761
 Torres Strait Islands 4,514
 Vestmannaeyjar 4,500
 Aegadian Islands 4,292
 Pontine Islands 4,066
 Falkland Islands 4,000
 Chagos Archipelago 3,000–5,000
 Fernando de Noronha 3,061
 Dahlak Archipelago 3,000
 Svalbard 2,667
 Bonin Islands 2,440
 Isles of Scilly 2,224
 Gambier Islands 1,533
 Aran Islands 1,225
 Northern Cook Islands 1,041
 Paracel Islands 1,000+
 Juan Fernandez Islands 900
 Chatham Islands 663
 Commander Islands 613
 Isole Tremiti 489
 Diomede Islands 135
 Phoenix Islands 24

See also
Archipelagic state
Archipelago
Archipelago Sea
List of archipelagos by number of islands
List of islands by name
Lists of islands

References